Abdul Hadi Daghlas, known as Abu Taisir, was a Jordanian man and a relative of Abu Musab al-Zarqawi. He was Zarqawi's top lieutenant in Iraq.

History
He traveled to the Khurmal camp  in Iraqi Kurdistan from Tehran, Iran. The Central Intelligence Agency traced his satellite phone and located him.

Death
On the second day of the 2003 invasion of Iraq, more than 40 American cruise missiles hit the town of Khurmal in Iraqi Kurdistan. Abdul Hadi Daghlas was among the dead.

References

2003 deaths
Jordanian al-Qaeda members
Jordanian Muslims
Year of birth missing